Paul Keegan is the name of:

Paul Keegan (footballer, born 1972), Irish football player
Paul Keegan (footballer, born 1984), Irish football player (Doncaster Rovers)